Bank pool is a pool game that has as its most fundamental requirement that all scoring shots in the game must be made by  a called ball off a  and into a called pocket. 

While the game has multiple variations, the predominant version through much of its history was played with a full fifteen-ball , of which the winning player was required to legally pocket eight balls. A shortened version of the game using nine balls of which the players must legally pocket five for the win, often called "nine-ball banks," gained popularity in the 1990s and 2000s and is the subject of international professional competition and televised matches.

Rules

Aim
The object of the game is to be the first player to  five balls in any order (or eight balls, when played with a full rack).

Rack
The balls are racked in nine-ball formation (or eight-ball formation if using a full rack), but in no particular order.
 
On the break shot, at least four balls must hit the rails else it is an illegal break. Any balls pocketed during the break do not count toward the score and will be spotted after the player's inning ends. Pocketing a ball on the break results in the player continuing to shoot.

On an illegal break, the opponent has the option of requesting a re-rack or accepting the table as-is and may begin shooting.

Play

Bank pool is one of the "cleanest" (no "") pool games — no  (the object ball must be hit directly with the cueball, without hitting the rail first); no  (shots must be cue ball to the object ball, then object ball to the called pocket, and the shooter must call both the ball and pocket); and the object ball cannot hit another ball on the way to the pocket (no ).

Fouls
The shooter "owes" the table a ball if they foul — a previously pocketed ball (if any) must be . Any balls that were sunk on that shot are spotted. If the shooter makes a legal bank shot and another ball goes in accidentally, it is not a foul, but that extra ball is spotted after the inning. It is also a foul if the shooter does not hit the  object ball and drive it or the cue ball to a cushion or pocket the object ball (this is different from nine-ball and standardized eight-ball, in which any ball may contact a rail after the object-ball hit to avoid fouling). A stricter variant preferred by some is that even three non-consecutive fouls is a loss of game. Players typically make sure the rules are clear and agreed-upon before play begins, especially when gambling.

References

External links
Official rules of bank pool of the Billiard Congress of America

Pool (cue sports)